Negley is a station on the East Busway, located in Shadyside and near the East Liberty and Friendship neighborhoods of Pittsburgh.

References

Bus stations in Pennsylvania
Martin Luther King Jr. East Busway